Kaeng Suea Ten Dam was a dam proposed for a site in the Phi Pan Nam Range, in Song District, Phrae Province, Thailand. It is near Mae Yom National Park, in a rural area of the Thai highlands.

Projected dam
The dam was planned on the Yom River in Kaeng Suea Ten in 1991, but the project was abandoned. The dam, if built, would have destroyed large areas of forest, where many of the tree species are valuable teak trees. The plans were renewed in 2006, drawing protest from the Assembly of the Poor and Living River Siam. Debate about the dam was opened again in 2011. The dam project has not been implemented due to the strong resistance of environmental groups and the villagers around the Mae Yom River.

References

External links
 Living River Siam
Bangkok Post - Living in the ugly shadow of the kaeng sua ten dam
Mothball dam plan for good
The Seub Nakhasathien Foundation
Dam controversies
Dams in Thailand
Buildings and structures in Phrae province
Proposed dams
Phi Pan Nam Range